Hunters is an American television drama series that aired on Syfy, created by Natalie Chaidez and executive produced by Chaidez, Emile Levisetti and Gale Anne Hurd. Based on Whitley Strieber's best-selling novel Alien Hunter, the series premiered on April 11, 2016.  It was originally going to air at 10/9c on Monday nights before the final six episodes were abruptly pushed back two hours in the schedule to Tuesdays at midnight due to the series' poor performance in the previous slot.

Syfy announced Hunters cancellation on July 8, 2016.

Premise
Hunters centers around the disappearance of a decorated Philadelphia cop's wife when he discovers an organization that hunts down alien terrorists.

Production
Developed in 2013, Hunters was ordered by Syfy in September 2014 with a straight 13-episode pick up at the time there were no casting announcements. Production began in Melbourne, Australia. Each episode takes its title from a different song by the British band Orchestral Manoeuvres in the Dark.

Cast

 Nathan Phillips as Flynn Carroll
 Britne Oldford as Allison Regan
 Mark Coles Smith as Dylan Briggs
 Lewis Fitz-Gerald as Truss Jackson
 Laura Gordon as Abby Carroll
 Shannon Berry as Emme Dawson
 Gareth Davies as Jules Callaway
 Sarah Peirse as Finnerman
 Edwina Wren as Michelle James
 Julian McMahon as Lionel McCarthy

Episodes

Reception
The series has been panned by many critics. Brian Lowry from Variety called the pilot "utterly generic, conceptually cynical and instantly forgettable." Boston Herald'''s Mark Perigard criticized the overacting from the cast and felt that the series seems like torture porn.Hunters'' sits with a 0% by critics and a 55% by audiences on Rotten Tomatoes in addition to a score of 34 from 12 critics over on Metacritic.

References

External links

2010s American drama television series
2016 American television series debuts
2016 American television series endings
English-language television shows
Serial drama television series
Syfy original programming
Television series by Universal Content Productions
Terrorism in television
Adaptations of works by Whitley Strieber
Television shows filmed in Australia